Phallus maderensis is a species of fungus in the stinkhorn family. Found in Madeira island, it was described as new to science in 2005.

References

External links

Phallales
Biota of Madeira
Fungi of Europe
Fungi described in 2008